Cymothoe preussi, or Preuss' orange glider, is a butterfly in the family Nymphalidae. It can be found in eastern Nigeria and western Cameroon. The habitat consists of forests.

Adult females mimic moths of genus Aletis.

References

Butterflies described in 1890
Cymothoe (butterfly)
Butterflies of Africa